Deborah Frizza is a former Australian cricketer. She played nine matches for Victoria (1990/91–1996/97), including during the side's first season in the Women's National Cricket League (WNCL).

Frizza also played 165 matches for Essendon Maribyrnong Park Ladies Cricket Club (EMPLCC).

References

External links
 
 

Year of birth missing (living people)
Place of birth missing (living people)
Living people
Australian cricketers
Australian women cricketers
Victoria women cricketers
Sportswomen from Victoria (Australia)